Operation Moshe may refer to:
 Operation Moses (Moshe), the covert removal of Ethiopian Jews from Sudan in 1984
 Battle of Beersheba (1948), codenamed Operation Moshe, the Israeli capture of Beersheba